Protein Wnt-9a (formerly Wnt14) is a protein that in humans is encoded by the WNT9A gene.

The WNT gene family consists of structurally related genes that encode secreted signaling proteins. These proteins have been implicated in oncogenesis and in several developmental processes, including regulation of cell fate and patterning during embryogenesis. This gene is a member of the WNT gene family. It is expressed in gastric cancer cell lines. The protein encoded by this gene shows 75% amino acid identity to chicken Wnt14, which has been shown to play a central role in initiating synovial joint formation in the chick limb. This gene is clustered with another family member, WNT3A, in the chromosome 1q42 region.

References

Further reading